The 21st Independent Spirit Awards, honoring the best in independent filmmaking for 2005, were announced on March 4, 2006.  It was hosted by Sarah Silverman.

Winners and nominees

{| class="wikitable"
!Best Feature
!Best Director
|-
|Brokeback Mountain

Capote
Good Night, and Good Luck.
The Squid and the Whale
The Three Burials of Melquiades Estrada
|Ang Lee – Brokeback Mountain

Gregg Araki – Mysterious Skin
Noah Baumbach – The Squid and the Whale
George Clooney – Good Night, and Good Luck.
Rodrigo García – Nine Lives
|-
!Best Male Lead
!Best Female Lead
|-
|Philip Seymour Hoffman – Capote

Jeff Daniels – The Squid and the Whale
Terrence Howard – Hustle & Flow
Heath Ledger – Brokeback Mountain
David Strathairn – Good Night, and Good Luck.
|Felicity Huffman – Transamerica

Dina Korzun – Forty Shades of Blue
Laura Linney – The Squid and the Whale
S. Epatha Merkerson – Lackawanna Blues
Cyndi Williams – Room
|-
!Best Supporting Male
!Best Supporting Female
|-
|Matt Dillon – Crash

Firdous Bamji – The War Within
Jesse Eisenberg – The Squid and the Whale
Barry Pepper – The Three Burials of Melquiades Estrada
Jeffrey Wright – Broken Flowers
|Amy Adams – Junebug

Maggie Gyllenhaal – Happy Endings
Allison Janney – Our Very Own
Michelle Williams – Brokeback Mountain
Robin Wright Penn – Nine Lives
|-
!Best Screenplay
!Best First Screenplay
|-
|Capote – Dan FuttermanNine Lives – Rodrigo García
The Squid and the Whale – Noah Baumbach
The Three Burials of Melquiades Estrada – Guillermo Arriaga
The War Within – Ayad Akhtar, Joseph Castelo and Tom Glynn
|Transamerica – Duncan TuckerThe Beautiful Country – Sabina Murray
Fixing Frank – Ken Hanes
Junebug – Angus MacLachlan
Me and You and Everyone We Know – Miranda July
|-
!Best First Feature
!Best Documentary
|-
|Crash

Lackawanna Blues
Me and You and Everyone We Know
Thumbsucker
Transamerica
|Enron: The Smartest Guys in the Room

Grizzly Man
Romántico
La Sierra
Sir! No Sir!
|-
!Best Cinematography
!Best Foreign Film
|-
|Good Night, and Good Luck. – Robert ElswitCapote – Adam Kimmel
Keane – John Foster
Last Days – Harris Savides
The Three Burials of Melquiades Estrada – Chris Menges
|Paradise Now • Palestine/Netherlands/Germany/FranceThe Death of Mr. Lazarescu • Romania
Duck Season • Germany/Turkey
Head-On • France
Tony Takitani • Japan
|}

 Films with multiple nominations and awards 

 Special awards 

John Cassavetes AwardConventioneers
Brick
Jellysmoke
The Puffy Chair
Room

Truer Than Fiction Award
Occupation: Dreamland
Our Brand Is Crisis
Romántico
Twelve Disciples of Nelson Mandela

Producers Award
Caroline Baron – Capote and Monsoon Wedding
Ram Bergman – Brick and Conversations with Other Women
Mike S. Ryan – Junebug and Palindromes

Someone to Watch Award
Ian Gamazon and Neill Dela Llana – Cavite
Robinson Devor – Police Beat
Jay Duplass – The Puffy Chair

External links 
2005 Spirit Awards at IMDb
Full official show on YouTube

References

2005
Independent Spirit Awards